Robert "Bazi" Weiß (21 April 1920 – 29 December 1944) was a Luftwaffe World War II fighter ace who served from 1939 until his death on 29 December 1944. A flying ace or fighter ace is a military aviator credited with shooting down five or more enemy aircraft during aerial combat. He was also a recipient of the Knight's Cross of the Iron Cross with Oak Leaves, the highest award in the military and paramilitary forces of Nazi Germany during World War II.

Early life and career
Weiß was born on 21 April 1920 in Baden bei Wien, Austria. He was the oldest son of a higher city secretary (Stadtobersekretär), a public servant, and police commissioner (Polizei-Inspektor).

In the beginning of his military career, he served with a flak regiment before transferring to learn to fly in early 1940. In early  1941, Leutnant (2nd Lieutenant) Weiß was a pilot with 6. Staffel, Jagdgeschwader 26 (JG 26—26th Fighter Wing) flying on the Channel Front. He claimed a Supermarine Spitfire shot down in September 1941. In September 1942, Weiß was transferred to 1. Staffel, Jagdgeschwader 54 (JG 54—54th Fighter Wing), based on the Eastern Front, flying operations on the Leningrad front. His victory score grew slowly, and by April 1943, he had claimed 30 victories. Falling ill in May 1943, he was hospitalised until July 1943.

After Oberleutnant Franz Eisenach was wounded in combat on 8 July, Weiß temporarily replaced him as Staffelkapitän (squadron leader) of 3. Staffel of JG 54 until his return on 15 September 1943. On 2 August 1943, he was awarded the German Cross in Gold. On 28 September, Weiß was appointed Staffelkapitän of 10. Staffel of JG 54. He replaced Oberleutnant Alfred Teumer who had been wounded in aerial combat on 3 September. By October, he had 68 claims and received the Knight's Cross of the Iron Cross for 98 claims in March 1944.

Western Front and death
Weiß was promoted to Hauptmann (captain) on 1 July 1944. On 21 July 1944, he was appointed Gruppenkommandeur (group commander) of III. Gruppe (3rd group) of JG 54. At the time, the Gruppe was based at Vélizy – Villacoublay Air Base, France on the Western Front and fought in German retreat following the Invasion of Normandy. The Gruppe was withdrawn from combat operations on 5 September, relocating to Oldenburg where it became the first unit to receive the new Fw 190 D-9. On 28 September, Weiß was credited with the destruction of a Supermarine Spitfire fighter, his 119th victory claim. His opponent was Flight Lieutenant Duncan McCuaig from the Royal Air Force (RAF) No. 541 Squadron, a photographic reconnaissance squadron.

III. Gruppe became fully operational on 25 December with all three squadrons uniting at Varrelbusch airfield. On 27 December, III. Gruppe fought Hawker Tempest fighters from the No. 486 Squadron, a New Zealand fighter squadron of the RAF. In this encounter, III. Gruppe lost five aircraft for one victory claimed. On 29 December, Weiß led his Gruppe in combat against Allied fighters of the RAF Second Tactical Air Force. Vectored by ground control to the Münster-Rheine area, the engagement ended with the destruction of 17 German fighters, 13 pilots killed and two wounded. In return III. Gruppe claimed eight aircraft shot down.
Weiß led the Stab, III./JG 54 and 11./JG 54 into a large formation of Spitfires from 331 and 501 Squadrons. None of Weiß's Schwarm returned, with 17 aircraft lost and 13 pilots, including Weiß, killed, while claiming six fighters.

Weiß was one of the pilots killed, he was shot down in his Fw 190 D-9 (Werknummer 210 060—factory number) "Black 10" near Lengerich. His victor was Flight Sergeant K. F. Haanes of the RAF No. 331 Squadron, a Norwegian squadron. He was posthumously awarded the Knight's Cross of the Iron Cross with Oak Leaves on 12 March 1945, the 782nd officer or soldier of the Wehrmacht so honored. Initially he was interred on the new cemetery in Lingen. In 1958, his remains were moved and reinterred to the war cemetery at Baden bei Wien and again moved to the Helenen cemetery where he now rests in a family grave. He was replaced by Oberleutnant Hans Dortenmann as commander of III. Gruppe of JG 54.

Summary of career

Aerial victory claims
According to US historian David T. Zabecki, Weiß was credited with 121 aerial victories. Obermaier also lists Weiß with 121 aerial victories in claimed 471 missions. 26 of his victories were claimed over the  Western Front. Included in his total are 40 Ilyushin Il-2s, 12 Supermarine Spitfires and five P-38 Lightnings. Mathews and Foreman, authors of Luftwaffe Aces – Biographies and Victory Claims, researched the German Federal Archives and found records for 122 aerial victory claims. This figure of confirmed claims includes 96 aerial victories on the Eastern Front and 26 Western Front, including three four-engined bombers.

Victory claims were logged to a map-reference (PQ = Planquadrat), for example "PQ 10191". These sectors were then subdivided into 36 smaller units to give a location area 3 × 4 km in size.

Awards
 Honour Goblet of the Luftwaffe (Ehrenpokal der Luftwaffe) on 8 May 1943 as Oberleutnant and pilot
 Iron Cross (1939)
 2nd Class (August 1940)
 1st Class (5 December 1941)
 German Cross in Gold on 12 July 1943 as Oberleutnant in the I./Jagdgeschwader 54
 Knight's Cross of the Iron Cross with Oak Leaves
 Knight's Cross on 26 March 1944 as Oberleutnant and Staffelkapitän of the 3./Jagdgeschwader 54
 782nd Oak Leaves on 12 March 1945 as Hauptmann and Gruppenkommandeur of the III./Jagdgeschwader 54

Notes

References

Citations

Bibliography

 
 
 
 
 
 
 
 
 
 
 
 
 
 
 
 
 
 
 

1920 births
1944 deaths
Luftwaffe pilots
German World War II flying aces
Luftwaffe personnel killed in World War II
Recipients of the Gold German Cross
Recipients of the Knight's Cross of the Iron Cross with Oak Leaves
Aviators killed by being shot down
People from Baden bei Wien